The 27th Canadian Parliament was in session from December 9, 1965 until April 23, 1968. The membership was set by the 1965 federal election on November 8, 1965, and it changed only somewhat due to resignations and by-elections until it was dissolved prior to the 1968 election.

It was controlled by a Liberal Party minority under Prime Minister Lester B. Pearson and the 19th Canadian Ministry. Pierre Trudeau succeeded Pearson as party leader and Prime Minister shortly before this Parliament ended for the 1968 national election.

The Official Opposition was the Progressive Conservative Party, led first by John Diefenbaker, and subsequently by Michael Starr.

The Speaker was Lucien Lamoureux.  See also List of Canadian electoral districts 1952-1966 for a list of the ridings in this parliament.

There were two sessions of the 27th Parliament.

Most of the MPs were elected as the single member for their district. Two represented Queen's (PEI) and two represented Halifax.

Distribution of seats at the beginning of the 27th Parliament

Notes:

"% change" refers to change from previous election
1 "Previous" refers to the results of the previous election, not the party standings in the House of Commons prior to dissolution.

List of members

Following is a full list of members of the twenty-seventh Parliament listed first by province or territory, then by electoral district.

Electoral districts denoted by an asterisk (*) indicates that district was represented by two members.

Alberta

British Columbia

Manitoba

New Brunswick

Newfoundland

1Granger resigned the seat of Grand Falls—White Bay—Labrador in August 1966  to contest a seat in the Newfoundland House of Assembly and was succeeded by Andrew Chatwood of the Liberals. Granger became Minister of Labrador Affairs in the provincial cabinet. He resigned his provincial office in September 1967 to contest the federal seat of Bonavista—Twillingate vacated by Jack Pickersgill. Granger was successful and became Minister without portfolio in Pearson's Cabinet.

Northwest Territories

Nova Scotia

Ontario

Prince Edward Island

Quebec

Saskatchewan

Yukon

By-elections

References

Succession

 
Canadian parliaments
1966 establishments in Canada
1968 disestablishments in Canada
1966 in Canadian politics
1967 in Canadian politics
1968 in Canadian politics
Lester B. Pearson